The women's 100 metres event at the 2004 World Junior Championships in Athletics was held in Grosseto, Italy, at Stadio Olimpico Carlo Zecchini on 13 and 14 July.

Medalists

Results

Final
14 July
Wind: +1.5 m/s

Semifinals
13 July

Semifinal 1
Wind: -0.1 m/s

Semifinal 2
Wind: +0.6 m/s

Semifinal 3
Wind: +0.1 m/s

Heats
13 July

Heat 1
Wind: -0.4 m/s

Heat 2
Wind: +0.9 m/s

Heat 3
Wind: +0.6 m/s

Heat 4
Wind: +0.3 m/s

Heat 5
Wind: -0.7 m/s

Heat 6
Wind: -0.1 m/s

Participation
According to an unofficial count, 43 athletes from 31 countries participated in the event.

References

100 metres
100 metres at the World Athletics U20 Championships